The Fresno Giants were a minor league baseball team that played in the California League from 1941 to 1988. The team was based in Fresno, California.

First teams
The city of Fresno had professional baseball as far back as 1898 when it had a team in the original California League, then considered an "outlaw" league (i.e., outside the bounds of Organized Baseball). The team dropped out of the league after that year, but the California League returned in 1905 with the Fresno Tigers, joined late in the season by Fresno native and future hall of famer Frank Chance. In 1906, the Tacoma Tigers of the Pacific Coast League moved to Fresno, playing as the Fresno Raisin Eaters for one season. In 1910, Fresno rejoined the old California League, which had entered Organized Baseball as the Class "D" California State League, but the league folded during the season. When the league reorganized, Fresno rejoined it in 1913, finishing second in a four-team league.  Fresno finished first in 1914, after which the team and league folded.  Starting in 1905, these teams played at Recreation Park.

Cardinals Affiliation
When the modern California League was founded in 1941 as a Class "C" minor league, the Fresno Cardinals were a charter member, the others being the Anaheim Aces, Bakersfield Badgers, Merced Bears, Riverside Reds, San Bernardino Stars, Santa Barbara Saints, and Stockton Fliers. The Cards finished first,  games ahead of the Saints, but lost the playoffs to the Saints 4 games to 1. In 1942, they finished second in a season shortened by America's entry into World War II. The league suspended play for the 1943, 1944, and 1945 seasons. In 1946, the California League resumed operations. The Cardinals won pennants in 1948 and 1952.

In 1955, the Cardinals fielded one of the best teams in the history of minor league baseball, ranked the 79th  best minor league team of all time by baseball historians Bill Weiss and Marshall Wright. It was one of only a handful of lower classification teams (i.e., Class A, B, C and D) to have been included in the top 100 minor league teams. The Cards finished 104–43 for a .707 won-lost percentage,  games ahead of the San Jose Red Sox for the season as a whole. The league played a split season schedule, though, and the Cards finished second,  games behind the Stockton Ports in the first half of the split season. In the second half, though Stockton faded, Fresno barely finished first, only one game over San Jose. In the playoffs, Fresno defeated Stockton 3 games to 1 to win the CL pennant. The 1955 Cardinals set league records for most runs (1,048), hits (1,500), and RBI (893) in a season. Their 104 games won and .707 winning percentage remain California League records to this day. The team won its last pennant in Fresno the following year, 1956.

The Fresno Cardinals had long been one of the league's more popular teams, due in large part to its affiliation with the major league Cardinals. Until 1955, St. Louis had been the major leagues' westernmost city, with the St. Louis Cardinals winning many fans in the western part of the United States as a result. In addition, a large percentage of the population of Fresno and the surrounding area consisted of transplants from the states of Oklahoma, Missouri, Texas, and Arkansas, who arrived with a natural affinity for the Cardinals.

The televising of major league baseball games and other factors began taking its toll on minor league attendance during the 1950s, with many teams and entire leagues folding as a result. Scaling back their minor league operations, the St. Louis Cardinals sold their Fresno club after the 1956 season to the Greater Fresno Youth Foundation and ended their affiliation with the team. In 1957 the team, now known as the Fresno Sun Sox, operated without a major league affiliation, and finished last.  Jerry Zuvela was the team captain.

In 2010, the Fresno Cardinals, a collegiate summer baseball team was founded.

Giants Affiliation

In 1958, the team entered into a working agreement with the San Francisco Giants, who had moved from New York the previous winter, and were renamed the Fresno Giants, winning the California League pennant in their inaugural year.

In 1963, the entire minor league system was reorganized, with the California League granted Class A status for the first time. As a Class A team, the Fresno Giants won championships in 1964, 1968, 1974, 1985 and 1987.  With the 1987 championship, Fresno tied Modesto for most California League championships (9) up to that time in the history of the league. On August 8, 1985, Fresno became the first California League franchise to win 3,000 games (Source: Bill Weiss).  Fresno hosted the California League All-Star game in 1986 and 1987 at Euless Park.

The Greater Fresno Youth Foundation operated the Fresno Giants and hosted an annual hot stove league dinner in the winter.  The San Francisco Giants, Oakland A's, Los Angeles Dodgers and other teams sent players and coaches to the dinner regularly as part of their winter hot stove league tours. The Greater Fresno Youth Foundation had two general managers during the time it owned the team.  Tom McGurn ran the ballclub (source: Fresno Bee death notice, October 24, 1989, retrieved July 11, 2014) from 1957 to 1978.  In those days, running a minor league baseball operation was a one-man job.  Bill Thompson, who had formerly teamed with Russ Hodges and Lon Simmons announcing San Francisco Giants radio broadcasts from 1965 to 1975, was hired as general manager in 1978 and was there when the Greater Fresno Youth Foundation sold the team to Modesto-based Save Mart Supermarkets president Bob Piccinini in 1982.  As minor league operations became more sophisticated and required more management, Piccinini and Thompson hired an assistant general manager, Curt Goldgrabe in 1983, and later Brian Pickering in 1987. Thompson remained general manager until Piccinini sold the Fresno franchise following the 1987 season. (In 1999, Piccinini led an unsuccessful attempt to buy the Oakland A's.)

An account of the rest of the ownership story of the Fresno Giants is found in a Fresno Bee sports article from September 13, 1988:
″Piccinini sold the team to Bill Yuill, a Canadian media mogul, for a reported $560,000 on September 15, 1987.  After the 46-year-old Euless grandstand was condemned because of structural defects and the team lost its long working agreement with the San Francisco Giants, Yuill reportedly sold it to Dave Kramer, a Van Nuys businessman, for $615,000 in 1988.

Kramer suffered major financial losses as the team was forced to rent portable bleachers and trailers to house its dressing rooms, concessions and offices at Euless.  In addition, the Fresno Suns operated as a co-op, with players supplied by several major league clubs and the Hanshin Tigers of Japan.″

Up to 1988, Fresno and the San Francisco Giants held the longest continuous working agreement in all of minor league baseball, 30 years.  Without a working agreement, operating independently as the Fresno Suns in 1988, and lacking an adequate park, the team finished near the bottom of the standings and drew only 34,734 patrons, less than half the league average. The franchise was bought by Joe Buzas, who moved it to Salinas for the 1989 season.

Minor league baseball returned to Fresno in 1998, when the owners of the Tucson Toros of the AAA Pacific Coast League moved their franchise to Fresno and renamed it the Fresno Grizzlies, where it once again became a San Francisco Giants affiliate.  Grizzlies games were played at Pete Beiden Field on the Fresno State campus until a new downtown ballpark, Chukchansi Park, was finished for the 2002 season.

Ballpark

 
The home of minor league baseball in Fresno was originally called Cardinal Field in 1941–42.  Grandstands seating 2,600 were built on the site during World War II (source: Fresno Bee, May 20, 1984, retrieved May 19, 2014) to host the Fresno Cardinals on the campus of what was known then as Fresno State College, and was called Fresno State College Park from 1946 to 1957.

After the Cardinals affiliation ended in 1957, the name was changed to John Euless Park for John Euless, a local proponent of professional baseball who was associated with the Greater Fresno Youth Foundation and instrumental in keeping pro baseball in Fresno by leading the charge to build the ballpark.  Euless came to Fresno in 1906 from Tennessee and was very involved in the city. He worked for real estate and insurance companies, helped start an oil enterprise in the Coalinga district, and advocated for local grape growers in Washington, D.C.
(Source: Fresno Bee 7/02/2014)

In 1956, Fresno State moved its campus to its present location in the northeast part of the city, and Fresno City College bought the old campus.

It seemed the beginning of the end of the ballpark started on April 24, 1984 when a gust of wind blew down the left field fence two hours before the start of a game (source: Fresno Bee, April 25, 1984, retrieved May 19, 2014), the same day a 6.1 earthquake hit northern California.  Then, the next night, a transformer blew during a game, knocking out the lights and cancelling two games against the Reno Padres (source: Fresno Bee, April 27, 1984, retrieved May 19, 2014).  The State Center Community College District, now owner of the ballpark, made an emergency allocation of $42,136 to finance repairs to the outfield fence during a meeting on Tuesday May 1, 1984, and repairs were completed about a month later (Source: Fresno Bee, May 3, 1984, retrieved June 9, 2014).  At the same time, Euless Park received a new scoreboard and new field lights, which were installed by July 14, 1984 (Source: Fresno Bee, July 15, 1984, retrieved June 9, 2014).

Constructed entirely of wood, the stadium grandstands were intended to be a temporary structure, but continued in its mostly original form until the stands were bulldozed due to structural defects (thought to be termite damage) in the spring of 1988. (Source: Fresno Bee column by Bob McCarthy, September 7, 1988, retrieved June 9, 2014)

Fresno City College baseball teams still use this facility for home games today.  The ballpark is adjacent to FCC's Ratcliffe football stadium and across Blackstone Avenue from the current Fresno City College campus.

Notable alumni

The following is an alphabetical list of Fresno  players and coaches who played or coached in the major leagues.  The year played in Fresno is listed after the name.

 Mike Aldrete (1983–84)
Gary Alexander (1974)
Chris Arnold (1967–68)
 Mike Benjamin (1987)*
Jose Barrios (1977)
Bob Barton (1960)
Randy Bockus (1983)
Bobby Bonds (1965–66)
Chris Bourjos (1977)
Jeff Brantley (1985)
Bob Brenly (1976, 78–79)
Chris Brown (1981–82)
Jake Brown (1969–70)
Ollie Brown (1964)
DeWayne Buice (1979–80)
Ron Bryant  (1967)
John Burkett(1985–86)
 Mark Calvert (1978)
Doug Capilla (1973)
Don Carrithers (1968)
Tom Cheney (1954)
Joseph Cherry (1985) 
Jack Clark (1974)
Will Clark (1985)
Alan Cockrell (1984)
Craig Colbert (1987)
Dennis Cook (1986)
Mike Corkins (1966–67)
Terry Cornutt (1973–74)
 John D'Acquisto (1972)
Dick Dietz (1960)
Chili Davis (1979),
Rob Deer (1981)
 Mike Eden (1973)
Ángel Escobar (1985)
Dick Estelle (1961)
Bobby Etheridge (1965)
 Pete Falcone (1974)
Bob Farley (1958)
Bob Fenwick (1968)
Ed Figueroa (1970–71)
Ed Fitz Gerald (1965–66)
George Foster (1969)
Alan Fowlkes (1980)
Bill Frost (1966)
Frank Funk (1972–73)
 Al Gallagher (1966)
Dave Garcia (1967–68)
Gil Garrido (1960)
Dan Gladden (1979–80),
Randy Gomez (1981)
Ed Goodson (1970)
Gene Green (1953)
César Gutiérrez (1966)
 Don Hahn (1968)
Ed Halicki (1973)
Bill Hands (1960)
Alan Hargesheimer (1978)
John Harrell (1970),
Jim Ray Hart (1961)
Charlie Hayes (1985)
Dave Heaverlo (1973)
 Ken Henderson (1964)
 Ron Herbel (1958)
 Gil Heredia (1987)
 Randy Hundley (1961–62)
 Larry Jackson (1952)
 Skip James (1972)
 Jim Johnson (1967)
 John Henry Johnson (1977)
 Greg Johnson (1976)
 Buddy Kerr (1960)
 Wendell Kim (player 1974, manager 1983-84-85)
 Jim King (1951–52)
 Joe Kmak (1986–87)
 Bob Knepper (1973–74)
 Randy Kutcher (1981)
 Coco Laboy (1959–60)
 Hal Lanier (1962)
 Mike Lee (1959)
 Johnnie LeMaster (1974)
 Dennis Littlejohn (1976)
 Greg Litton (1985)
  Garry Maddox (1968, 71)
 Jim Maloney (manager 1982)
Gary Matthews (1970)
Randy McCament (1986)
 Mike McCormick (manager 1958–59)
 John McNamara (1951)
 Greg Minton (1974), Randy Moffitt (1970)
 Jose Morales (1965)
 Terry Mulholland (1984)
 Masanori Murakami (1964)
  Matt Nokes (1983)
  Tom O'Malley (1980)
 Steve Ontiveros (1971)
 Phil Ouellette (1983)
 Casey Parsons (1976)
 Gil Patterson (1982)
 Tony Perezchica (1986)
 Cap Peterson (1960)
 Mike Phillips (1970)
Skip Pitlock (1969)
 Ed Plank (1974–75)
 Willie Prall (1972)
 John Pregenzer (1961)
 Miguel Puente (1968)
 Luis Quintana (1973)
  John Rabb (1980)
Dave Rader (1967–68)
 Jeff Ransom (1978–79)
 Jessie Reid (1981-82-85)
 Rip Repulski (1948)
 Bob Reynolds (1966)
 Jeff Robinson (1983)
 Jimmy Rosario (1966)
 Rafael Robles (1968)
 Minnie Rojas (1961)
 Mike Rowland (1975)
 Vic Roznovsky (1960)
 Tom Runnells (1978)
 Gary Ryerson (1967–68)
Roger Samuels (1987)
 Mackey Sasser (1984–85)
 Wally Shannon (1952)
 Elías Sosa (1970–71)
 Horace Speed (1971)
 Steve Stanicek (1982–83)
 Steve Stone (1969)
 Joe Strain (1977)
 Steve Stroughter (1973–75)
 Guy Sularz (1975–76)
 Russ Swan (1987)
Stu Tate (1985)
 Bob Taylor (1964)
 Robby Thompson (1983–84)
 Tommy Toms (1973)
 Héctor Torres (1963–64)
Frenchy Uhalt (1949)
 Reggie Walton (1974)
Bill Werle (manager 1963–64, 69–70)
 Bernie Williams (1968)
 Frank Williams (1980–81)
 Jim Willoughby (1968–69)
 Neil Wilson (1958)
 Alan Wirth (1976)

The 1988 Fresno Suns players who played in the major leagues.
 Ralph Citarella 
 Julio Cruz
 Dwayne Murphy
 Mike Richardt 
 Andy Rincon 
 Terry Whitfield

Individual awards

Fresno players and coaches who received California League or significant Major League Baseball awards.

California League Awards

Most Valuable Player:
1946 Tommy Glaviano, 1952 Larry Jackson, 1958 O'Neil Wilson, 1964 Ollie Brown, 1972 Skip James, 1974 Gary Alexander, 1986 Ty Dabney

Pitcher of the Year:
1985 Charlie Corbell

Rookie of the Year:
1949 John Romonosky, 1956 Nelson Chittum, 1964 Masanori Murakami, 1974 Jack Clark, 1986 Ty Dabney

Manager of the Year:
1955 Roland LeBlanc, 1956 Ed Lyons, 1964 Bill Werle, 1968 Dave Garcia, 1974 John Van Ornum, 1980 Jack Mull, 1985 Wendell Kim

Major League Baseball Awards

National League Most Valuable Player: George Foster, 1977 Cincinnati Reds

Gold Glove Winners: Randy Hundley, Chicago Cubs 1967, Bobby Bonds, San Francisco 1973–74, Garry Maddox, Philadelphia 1975-76-77-78-79-80-81-82, Dwayne Murphy, Oakland 1980-81-82-83-84-85, Will Clark, San Francisco 1991, Robby Thompson, San Francisco 1993

Rolaids Relief Man Award: Jeff Brantley, Cincinnati 1996

Roberto Clemente Award: Garry Maddox, Philadelphia 1986

Major League Baseball Rookie of the Year Award: Gary Matthews, San Francisco 1973

Silver Slugger Award: George Foster, Cincinnati 1981, Jack Clark, St. Louis 1985 & 1987, Matt Nokes, Detroit 1987, Will Clark, San Francisco 1989 & 1991, Robby Thompson, San Francisco 1993

National League Manager of the Year: Hal Lanier, 1986 Houston Astros

San Francisco Giants Wall of Famers

Former Fresno Giants in bold.

Yearly Records

References
Notes

Sources

 Team # 79—1955 FRESNO CARDINALS (104–43) The Top 100 Minor League Teams: Team # 79–1955 Fresno Cardinals, by Bill Weiss & Marshall Wright, Baseball Historians
 Baseball Reference
 California League official website
 San Francisco Giants Radio Announcers from SF Giants official website

Defunct California League teams
Sports in Fresno, California
San Francisco Giants minor league affiliates
St. Louis Cardinals minor league affiliates
Professional baseball teams in California
Baseball teams established in 1941
Baseball teams disestablished in 1988
Defunct baseball teams in California
Baseball in Fresno, California
1941 establishments in California
1988 disestablishments in California